Lois Ann Pfiester (November 20, 1936 – September 28, 1992) was an American phycologist and protistologist, specializing in freshwater dinoflagellate species.

Biography 
Pfiester received in 1965 her A.B. from Spalding University, in 1970 her M.A. from Murray State University, and in 1974 her Ph.D. in botany from Ohio State University. She joined in 1974 the faculty of the botany department of the University of Oklahoma as an assistant professor and was a full professor there in 1992 at the time of her death. She directed 4 doctoral dissertations and was the author or coauthor of over 75 journal articles.

In 1978 she went to Prague for four weeks to work with the protistologist Jiří Popovský. The two colleagues identified more than 30 different stages to the life cycle of dinoflagellates of the genus Cystodinedria.

Pfiester was an associate editor for the Journal of Phycology from 1980 to 1988. In 1990 she was the president of the Phycological Society of America.

She was an internationally recognized expert on dinoflagellates, especially the genus Peridinium. She was the first to study dinoflagellate life history using light, scanning, and electron transmission microscopy.

In 1978 she married Dee Fink. In 1982 they adopted a son, Andrew Fink, and in 1983 a daughter, Laura Fink.

In 1988 North Carolina State University researchers JoAnn Burkholder and Edward Noga discovered a new dinoflagellate genus which they named Pfiesteria in honor of Lois Ann Pfiester.

References 

American phycologists
Women phycologists
Protistologists
Women botanists
1936 births
1992 deaths
Spalding University alumni
Murray State University alumni
Ohio State University alumni
University of Oklahoma faculty
20th-century American botanists
20th-century American women scientists
People from Louisville, Kentucky
American women academics